Associate-O-Matic, developed by Gyrofly, Inc., was a commercial online store management system for Amazon.com Associates. It was PHP-based, using the Apache web server and XML. 

As of February 2nd 2018, Associate-O-Matic has been officially discontinued. The program and official site has been sold to Carey Baird and Fresh Store Builder. It's recommended that all AOM users transition to FSB.

References

External links
Official Associate-O-Matic webpage
Fresh Store Builder

Articles
Inc. Magazine "Use Cheap Web Tools" by Mike Fitzgerald
Dr. Dobb's Journal "Surviving in the Amazon Jungle"

PHP software
Electronic trading systems
Amazon (company)